Harry Feldman (November 10, 1919 – March 16, 1962) was an American Major League Baseball pitcher who played for the New York Giants from 1941 to 1946.

Early and personal life
Feldman was born and grew up in the Bronx, and was Jewish, the son of a Romanian Jewish father and a Polish Jewish mother. Feldman attended Clark Junior High School in the Bronx.

Minor league career
Feldman pitched for the Blytheville Giants of the Northeast Arkansas League in 1938. He had a 13–1 record and 2.02 ERA, both the best in the league that year.  He was moved to the Fort Smith Giants of the Western Association, where he was 7–7 with a 3.98 ERA in 1938. In 1939 his record was 25–9. With the Jersey City Giants in 1940, Feldman was 5–13 with a 3.64 ERA. In 1941 he went 14–16 with a 3.42 ERA.

Major league career
Feldman did the bulk of his pitching for the Giants during the World War II years (1942–45).

Feldman won his first major league game in his second start, a 4–0 shutout over the Boston Braves in the second game of a doubleheader at the Polo Grounds (September 21, 1941).

In 1944 Feldman was 9th in the NL with 40 games pitched. In 1945 Feldman was 6th in the NL in games started (30) and shutouts (3), and 9th in innings (217.7) and batters faced (933).  He was 12–13, with a 3.27 ERA.

His career totals include a 35–35 record, 143 games pitched, 78 starts, 22 complete games, 6 shutouts, 28 games finished, and 3 saves. In 666 innings pitched Feldman struck out 254, walked 300, and had an earned run average of 3.80.

In 1946 Feldman joined what became a total of 27 major league players, including Max Lanier, Mickey Owens, Vern Stephens and George Hausmann, in jumping to the "outlaw" Mexican League. Feldman signed with the Veracruz Blues. The following year he played in Havana, Cuba. In 1949 he pitched for a while in the Provincial League for Sherbrooke, Quebec, and then moved to San Francisco where he pitched his last two seasons with the San Francisco Seals, going 6–9 with a 4.31 ERA in 1949 and 11–16 with a 4.38 ERA in 1950.  He retired at the end of that season.

Feldman was 8th lifetime in ERA of all Jewish major league pitchers through 2010, behind among others Sandy Koufax and Ken Holtzman.

After baseball
Feldman was very active in the local semi-pro league.

On March 16, 1962, at age 42, Feldman died of a massive heart attack while tending his boat at Lake Tenkiller in nearby Oklahoma. He is buried at Rose Lawn Cemetery, Fort Smith, Arkansas.

See also
List of select Jewish baseball players

References

External links

Harry Feldman - Baseballbiography.com

1919 births
1962 deaths
American people of Romanian-Jewish descent
American people of Polish-Jewish descent
Jewish American baseball players
Jewish Major League Baseball players
Major League Baseball pitchers
New York Giants (NL) players
Sportspeople from the Bronx
Baseball players from New York City
20th-century American Jews